Zorlu Töre (born 1956) is a Turkish Cypriot politician. He has been Northern Cyprus Assembly Speaker since 2022.

References 

1956 births
Living people
Turkish Cypriot politicians
Speakers of the Assembly of Northern Cyprus

21st-century Cypriot politicians